Panchanan Bhattacharya (1853–1919) was a disciple of the Indian Yogi Lahiri Mahasaya. He was the first disciple to be authorized by Lahiri Mahasaya to initiate others into Kriya Yoga, and helped to spread Lahiri Mahasaya's teachings in Bengal through his Arya Mission Institution.

Life
Bhattacharya was born in the Ahiritola area of Kolkata. He took to the life of Brahmacharya, or celibacy, at a very young age. In the course of his wandering he met Lahiri Mahasaya in Varanasi. Lahiri Mahasaya agreed to initiate him in Kriya Yoga under the condition that he give up his sannyas vows and return to a householder life. Bhattacharya fulfilled this condition and received initiation from Lahiri Mahasaya. As a householder, he worked as a flower vendor.

Around the year 1885 he was permitted by the sage to set up an institution, the Aryya Mission Institution, for publishing Kriya related books. Paramahansa Yogananda in his book, Autobiography of a Yogi wrote:

The Aryya Mission Institution as founded by Panchanan Bhattacharya closed many years ago. It was revived again in recent years. 

Some of Panchanan Bhattacharya's disciples include Srish Chandra Mukherjee, Bamandev Banerjee, Hairmohan Banerjee, Netai Charan Banerjee, Barada Charan Majumdar, Kumarnath Mukherjee, Jeevanlal Choudhury, Nagendranath Choudhury, amongst others. Many disciples initiated by Lahiri Mahasaya also went to Panchanan Bhattacharya for advanced Kriya yoga instruction.

See also
Mahavatar Babaji
Yukteswar Giri

Notes

References

 Reprint of 1946 first edition published by Philosophical Library, New York.

Further reading
Swami Satyeswarananda Giri. The Divine Incarnation of Panchanan Bhattacharya, Chief Disciple of Lahiri Mahasay. 1996. , p. 217-218

External links

20th-century Bengalis
19th-century Bengalis
Bengali Hindus
Bengali Hindu saints
Indian monks
19th-century Indian monks
20th-century Indian monks
Indian Hindu monks
Indian Hindu saints
Indian Hindu religious leaders
19th-century Hindu religious leaders
20th-century Hindu religious leaders
Indian Hindu yogis
Kriya yogis
1853 births
1919 deaths
Indian yoga gurus